Seymour is a city in Jackson County, Indiana, United States. Its population was 21,569 at the 2020 census.

The city is noted for its location at the intersection of two major north–south and east–west railroads, which cross each other in the downtown area. The north–south line (the Jeffersonville, Madison and Indianapolis Railroad) was built in the 1840s and connected Indianapolis to the Ohio River at Jeffersonville. In 1852, Captain Meedy Shields persuaded Hezekiah Cook Seymour into building the eastwest railroad (the Ohio and Mississippi Railroad) through his land, and in return named the city in Seymour's honor. The firsts settlers arrived in the spring of 1853.

The companies Aisin USA and Rose Acre Farms are headquartered in Seymour, and Cummins operates a plant in the area. The city is also home to the 2nd largest high school gymnasium in the United States by seating capacity.

History

19th Century

Seymour was laid out and plated on April 27, 1852, near the 1809 Indian Treaty Corner and approximately two miles south of the village of Rockford, Indiana; the terminus of the north-south railroad before the opening of the purchase of 1828 and the construction of the railbridge over the White River. During the latter 1840's, a north–south railroad connecting the Ohio River at Jeffersonville with Indianapolis was built crossing the Shields’ farm. In 1852, an east–west railroad was being surveyed through Jackson County and Meedy Shields persuaded the Ohio and Mississippi Rail Road to run through his property. In exchange for this favor, he agreed to name the town after the railroad's civil engineer, Henry C. Seymour, although some sources mention J. Seymour, who was the surveyor.

Seymour was derisively referred to as a "mule crossing" because its slow initial development and lack of interest from the railroad companies. The town did not see significant development until the state legislature, led by the efforts of Indiana State Senator, Meedy Shields, passed a law requiring all trains to stop at railroad-railroad intersections. By increasing safety statewide in a time before widespread semaphore use, it increased the value of land around such intersections and made them safer for warehousing.

In 1858, Blish Mill opened as the first mill in town. By 1881, Seymour would have three mills within the city limits. The large grain tower still stands near the north-south and east-west railroad intersection and the center of town.

Seymour was once a stop on the Underground Railroad. On April 20, 1860, an Adams Express packaged (shipped from Nashville, Tennessee and addressed to "Hannah Johnson [care of] Levi Coffin") burst open at Seymour while en route to Cincinnati, Ohio. (Levi Coffin was a leading Hoosier abolitionist and the unofficial leader of the Underground Railroad.) The package contained a person fleeing slavery and looking for freedom in the north. A similar incident occurred earlier in Kentucky. The true identity of "Hannah Johnson" remains a mystery. Although Indiana was a "free state," Article XIII of the state constitution of 1851 made it illegal for African Americans to settle in Indiana and the Fugitive Slave Act permitted bounty hunters to capture and return people to slavery. The fugitive, later identified as Alexander McClure, was arrested and returned to Louisville and then to his owner in Nasville, TN. It took a civil war and the Citizenship Clause of the Fourteenth Amendment in 1868 to ensure each African American the right of citizenship.

The Civil War

During the American Civil War, despite southern Indiana's strong Copperheads political sentiment, the city of Seymour and surrounding area raised three separate infantry regiments for service in the Union Army.  Volunteers from Seymour were organized at Camp Heffron in Seymour. The entirety of the 50th Indiana Infantry Regiment commanded by former Indiana Secretary of State, Colonel Cyrus L. Dunham, portions of the 6th Indiana Infantry Regiment and 10th Indiana Cavalry Regiment.  Captain Meedy Shields trained local minutemen militia units in response to Morgan's Raid in 1863 while several regiments of infantry were sent from Indianapolis.

The 50th Indiana Infantry Regiment lost during their service 3 officers and 54 enlisted men killed and mortally wounded and 3 officers and 158 enlisted men by disease for a total of 218 casualties during the war. Colonel Dunham, a democrat, was accused of harboring confederate sympathies and mustered out of the regiment in 1863 under a cloud of suspicion. Lt. Colonel Heffron, who was poorly regarded by the men of the regiment, was also dismissed from the army and replace by Major Samuel T Wells, a Valonia, Indiana native, a Mexican-American war veteran, and former Jackson County Sheriff. Wells would go on to command the regiment after Durham's resignation until the 50th was dissolved and all men transferred to the 52nd Indiana Infantry Regiment who were also stationed in occupation garrison in Mobile, Alabama.

Due to its strategic location along rail lines with the large cities of Indianapolis, Chicago, and Detroit to the north and St. Louis to the west, Seymour was an important waypoint for the movement of men and supplies to the front during the war.  On January 20, 1864, during the transfer of Confederate prisoners of war, six officers escaped.  One was later recaptured in town. The New York Times reports that on January 22, 1864, a "Soldier's riot" wherein two soldiers were killed, and several others were injured.

Post War

After the war, local veterans organized the Ellsworth Post 20 of the G.A.R.  At its zenith, the post included two hundred and twenty-two local citizen who had served the Union during the war as members.  During its long existence, the organization included many prominent community members.  The Ellsworth Post was active in local charities, organized burial services for local veterans and conducted official observances on Decoration Day.  The final member of the post, James H Boak, lived to be 98 years old.  He died in 1942 closing one of the longest running G. A. R. chapters in existence.

An infamous local murder occurred in January 1866 when a traveling merchant, Moore Woodmansee, 42, on his way to Cincinnati, OH, disappeared while staying at the Rader House.  The Rader House was operated by proprietor Captain George Rader and was the center of gambling, theft, prostitution, and a string of mysterious disappearances.  Months after he disappeared the headless body of Moore Woodmansee was found downriver in the East Fork of the White River; then known as the Driftwood River.  Rader was implicated in the murder.  Two local witnesses were murdered.  Rader and his son-in-law were ultimately acquitted but forced to leave town.

A robbery of the Adams Express Car on the east-west Ohio and Mississippi line near Brownstown was reported in July 1866.  That night the perpetrators were chased by a local vigilance committee of 300 men that continued into the Rockford area.  Three days later the Reno brothers had been identified as the leaders of the gang and newspapers were recounting the notorious deeds of the family.  Later that year, Seymour was the site of the world's first successful peacetime train robbery, in which the train was moving. It was committed by the local Reno Gang, on October 6, 1866, just east of town, starting in the Adams Express Company car of the Ohio and Mississippi Railroad. The gang was put into prison for the robbery, and later lynched at Hangman's Crossing outside town. The insolvent Ohio and Mississippi Railroad was reorganized in 1867 as the Ohio and Mississippi Railway.

About 1876, a general strike of approximately 500 railroad-men occurred at Seymour and nearby North Vernon, Indiana, led by armed brakemen, engineers and other railroad employees who had not been paid for two and a half months by the Ohio and Mississippi Railroad.  A paper reported that the whole of the communities of Seymour and North Vernon were armed and in revolt. A contingent of US Marshals and detectives were sent from Cincinnati to end the strike.  During the strike, all passenger and cargo service through Seymour and North Vernon was suspended. The Ohio and Mississippi Railway was purchased in 1893 by B&O Southwestern Railroad.

The town's first high school was built in 1871 on the vacant lot of the disbanded civil war encampment.  Frank B Shields, a Seymour native, former MIT professor and inventor of Barbasol shaving cream subsequently donated the land used by the James Shields memorial gym.

During the years prior to the turn of the 20th century Seymour saw a significant influx of Dutch and German migrants of the Lutheran faith. These migrants eventually established many successful local farms and businesses. These earlier pioneers' influence continues today and can be seen in the city's annual Oktoberfest celebration.

20th Century

Seymour fielded its own minor league team, the Seymour Reds, beginning in 1900.  Pee Wee Reese once play with the Seymour Reds before being called up to the majors.  The team had their own field, Redlands Park, north of the Shields City Park.

Construction concluded and the Seymour Public Library opened to the public in January 1905 following a grant of $10,000 from the Carnegie Foundation in 1903 led by the Public-School Superintendent and President of the Seymour Public Library Board, Professor H.C. Montgomery. Efforts to bring a library to Seymour began twenty years early in 1881. Early library collections were housed in a local bookshop and then Shields High School until the new Carnegie library opened. The public library was part of more than $2.6 million in grants issued in the state of Indiana for more than 160 libraries: more than any other state.

WWI and WWII

During the World War I, nine Seymour natives died in combat. Seymour's first municipal airport, the White River Valley Flying Field, was located on the Henry Ahlert farm (once owned by the Renos) near the White River north of the city.

In 1934, Seymour police officer John Pfaffenberger was shot and killed by three assailants after he attempted to stop their car after they stole a few dollars' worth of fuel from a gas station east of town.  One defendant, a Nashville, Indiana native Edward Coffin was subsequently sentenced to death and sent to Indiana's electric chair for the murder of officer Pfaffenberger.  His co-defendants were sentenced to lengthy prison sentences.

During WWII, the US government purchased 2,500 acres of land southwest of town for use as an airfield.  Freeman Army Airfield operated from 1942 to 1946.  The based was first used for twin engine training.  The first class was graduated on 29 April and the graduated went on to fly multi-engine aircraft such as the B-24 Liberator, B-17 Flying Fortress, B-29 Superfortress, and various other medium bombers and transport aircraft. Twin-engine training continued with a total of 19 classes of students being graduated from Freeman Field using a total of 250 Beechcraft AT-10 Wichita trainers. The last graduates were in May 1944; 4,245 total cadets.

Freeman Army Airfield was the first helicopter base in the US. The first instructor pilots arrived on 30 June and preparations for the helicopter training were made in great secrecy, as in 1944 very few people had seen one and the technology was new and revolutionary. The group assigned to coordinate their arrival was known as "Section B-O".  A total of six Sikorsky R-4 helicopters were assigned for training, flown directly to Freeman from the Sikorsky plant at Bridgeport, Connecticut.  This was the longest long-distance flight of helicopters at the time.

The Freeman Field Mutiny occurred in 1945, in which African American members of the 477th Bombardment Group attempted to integrate an all-white officers' club at Freeman Army Air Corps Base. The mutiny later led to the integration of the United States military.

Nearing the end of WWII, Freeman Field was designated the Foreign Aircraft Evaluation Center for the Air Force. After the end of the war in Europe, captured German and Italian aircraft were collected by "Operation Lusty". Freeman Field was also charged with the mission to receive and catalogue United States equipment for display at the present and for the future AAF museum. However, these operations, including the helicopter training mission were moved to other locations and Freeman Field was deactivated and deeded to the city of Seymour in 1946.  Future astronaut Gus Grissom enlisted as an aviation training cadet at Freeman Field in 1944.

Mid century

During the last week of June 1952, the city of Seymour held a week-long centennial celebration that included concerts, parades, a re-enactment of the Reno Brothers train robbery, contests, and a play entitled "The Seymour Story".  The B&O Railroad loaned Engine #25 and several cars from their Baltimore Museum for use in the Reno reenactment scenes. During the week, local industries paid their employers in silver dollars to commemorate the event.

During the Korean War, five soldiers from Seymour died in the conflict.

Beginning in 1959, the city's former high school, Shields High School classes were moved to the new Seymour High School west of town.  In 1970, the school corporation completed construction of the second largest school gymnasium in the United States.  In 1981, The gym was renamed the "Lloyd E Scott" gymnasium in honor of the Indiana Hall of Fame basketball coach.

Seymour police officer Donald M. Winn was severely wounded investigating an attempted burglary on October 28, 1961. He died of the wounds on November 7, 1961. Winn was a veteran of WWII, the son of a state police officer, and was the former Chief of Police of Seymour's small police force. Winn's two assailants pled guilty to murder and were each sentenced to life in prison.

During the Vietnam War, seven Seymour servicemen were killed in action. The highest-ranking soldier killed in action from Seymour was Command Sergeant Major William Henry Clevenger, United States Army who enlisted in the United States Army during World War Two.  He was awarded the Silver Star and the Distinguished Flying Cross.

Late century

In 1970, future Rock and Roll Hall of Fameer John Mellencamp graduated from Seymour High School.  He briefly attended nearby Vincennes University before returning to Seymour and working for the local telephone company while pursuing a music career. On October 2, 1976, at the behest of Mellencamp's new management and record label, the city of Seymour dedicated it's Oktoberfest parade to young Mellencamp. The mayor declared that day "Johnny Cougar Day" and the city celebrated by parading "Johnny Cougar" through downtown to help promote his debut album, the Chestnut Street Incident.

Local educator, historian, and author, Edwin J Boley, wrote the definitive history of the Reno Gang escapades in his 1977 work, The Masked Halters.

A series of murders occurred in the Seymour area that were linked to Rose Acre Farms. Theresa Osborne 1973, Mike Reece, 1977, Carrie Croucher 1983, all Rose Acre employees with ties to founded David Rust all died under mysterious circumstances. Theresa Osborne's body was found in the trunk of her burnt and abandon vehicle weeks after her disappearance.  The deaths remained under investigation for years and were the focus of a series of articles from journalists at the Louisville Courier-Journal.  Local authorities investigated the deaths, but no charges were ever brought against David Rust, who died in 2004.

On August 15, 1981, Seymour police officer Jack Osborne died after being hit by a motorist at the scene of a traffic accident on Interstate 65.  He was the third Seymour police officer to die in the line of duty.

On March 29, 1983, Christopher Moritz resigned as mayor after a judge found him guilty of four counts of accepting bribes while in office.  He was sentenced to five years in prison and barred from holding public office for ten years.  Moritz began serving his sentence on December 8, 1984. Donald Scott served the remaining balance of Moritz's term until William Bailey assumed office.

In 1985, Mellencamp released "Small Town" a song written about his hometown. It reached #6 on the U.S. Billboard Hot 100 chart  MTV included the associated music video in frequent rotation.  This video, and approximately five others were filmed in around the Seymour area during this timeframe. The videos included shots of Riverview Cemetery, Rockford, the Rok-Sey Arena, downtown Seymour, and cameo of many locals. This, with the release of "Rain on the Scarecrow" single and music video increased awareness of the plight of rural American farmer in general and life in Seymour specifically. Many regional and national media outlets produced segments about Seymour during this timeframe.

Future IU basketball coach Teri Moren graduated from Seymour High School in 1987 and was named an Indiana All Star that year. She led the Seymour Owls to four sectional titles, two regional championships, a semi-state win and a 1987 state finals appearance.

Seymour's east-west railroad, which had been controlled by the B&O since the previous century, was merged in 1987 into CSX Transportation, creating one of the largest Class I railroads in North America.

In the early 1990s, Seymour was the setting for Falling from Grace, starring Mellencamp and released in 1992. The film was loosely biographical and included many local landmarks like Larrison's diner during filming.

On Christmas Day 1998, the historic Walton Hotel first known at the Rader House, and then the Faulkner House, then known as the Centennial Hotel, burned to the ground in an accidental fire that killed one person.  The property first built in 1854 and one of the oldest structures in Seymour was in the process of being restored and was being used as low-income housing at the time of the fire.

21st Century
Thanks to the efforts of then Lt. Governor John Mutz and community leaders at the Jackson County Industrial Development Corporation, Aisin constructed a factory in the United States in 1986, with production beginning in 1989. Initial estimates suggested 200 new employees but by 2020, Aisin employed more than 2,000 local residents. This Aisin factory in Seymour, Indiana has been expanded and supplies components for Honda, General Motors, Mitsubishi, Nissan and Toyota.

The 106-mile (171 km) north-south railroad line that serves Seymour was purchased by the Louisville and Indiana Railroad from Conrail in March 1994. The Seymour Diamond Crossing is a good place to also watch the east-west railroad line, which CSX upgraded in 2016 for reliable higher speed operation. LIRC acts as a short-line railroad to provide switching services for access to the CSX mainline.

Immigration from San Sebastián Coatán, Guatemala began about 1989 as indigenous Chuj people found the American Dream in the United States. As word spread to their families and friends in their hometown of San Sebastián Coatán about the quality of life in Seymour, more families journeyed from their poverty stricken part of Guatemala to a newer, more fruitful life in the U.S. Immigrants from Guatemala now make up more than 10% of the population.

In November 2019, the city unveiled a large mural of John Mellencamp, painted on the side of a local guitar store.  The store's owner, Larry McDonald, is a longtime-friend and former bandmate of Mellencamp.  The Mellencamp family donated $50,000.00 to help turn the former parking lot into a green space so more people could enjoy the mural painted by artist Sue Bliss.

The city's parks department began efforts to restore the long-neglected Civil War Memorial in Shields Park.

Geography

Seymour is located at  (38.956350, -85.890068).

Topography
The topology is dominated by the East Fork of the White River, a slow moving, heavily-silted and meandering floodplain.  Because of the surrounding low lying swamplands and agricultural activity, the river is prone to frequent flooding averaging 19 days above flood stage per year; with at least three major floods recorded since 1900.

Demographics

2020 census

As of the census of 2020, there were 21,569 people and 7,866 households in the city. The racial makeup of the city was 82.2% White, 2.0% African American, 0.2% Native American, 4.3% Asian, 0.1% Pacific Islander, and 2.3% from two or more races. Hispanic or Latino of any race were 13.0% of the population.

2010 census

As of the census of 2010, there were 17,503 people, 6,907 households, and 4,514 families living in the city. The racial makeup of the city was 90.3% White, 1.3% African American, 0.2% Native American, 1.2% Asian, 0.1% Pacific Islander, 5.1% from other races, and 1.8% from two or more races. Hispanic or Latino of any race were 11.5% of the population.

There were 6,907 households, of which 34.4% had children under the age of 18 living with them, 45.3% were married couples living together, 13.5% had a female householder with no husband present, 6.5% had a male householder with no wife present, and 34.6% were non-families. 28.1% of all households were made up of individuals, and 9.8% had someone living alone who was 65 years of age or older. The average household size was 2.49 and the average family size was 3.01.

The median age in the city was 35.5 years. 25.3% of residents were under the age of 18; 8.7% were between the ages of 18 and 24; 28.6% were from 25 to 44; 24% were from 45 to 64; and 13.4% were 65 years of age or older. The gender makeup of the city was 48.7% male and 51.3% female.

2000 census

As of the census of 2000, there were 18,101 people, 7,231 households, and 4,743 families living in the city. The racial makeup of the city was 93.4% White, 1.0% African American, 0.3% Native American, 1.4% Asian, 0.1% Pacific Islander, 2.9% from other races, and 0.9% from two or more races. Hispanic or Latino of any race were 4.9% of the population.

There were 7,231 households, out of which 32.6% had children under the age of 18 living with them, 49.4% were married couples living together, 11.5% had a female householder with no husband present, and 34.4% were non-families. 28.5% of all households were made up of individuals, and 11.6% had someone living alone who was 65 years of age or older. The average household size was 2.46 and the average family size was 2.99.

In the city, the population was spread out, with 25.5% under the age of 18, 10.2% from 18 to 24, 31.4% from 25 to 44, 19.4% from 45 to 64, and 13.5% who were 65 years of age or older. The median age was 34 years. For every 100 females, there were 95.7 males. For every 100 females aged 18 and over, there were 93.0 males.

The median income for a household in the city was $36,883, and the median income for a family was $43,357. Males had a median income of $30,638 versus $22,265 for females. The per capita income for the city was $18,222. About 8.0% of families and 10.0% of the population were below the poverty line, including 9.7% of those under age 18 and 11.6% of those age 65 or over.

Government

Mayors are elected by city-wide election every four years from qualified candidates who are residents of the city. In 2019, local businessman, former city councilman, and 1996 graduate of Seymour High School and a 1998 graduate of Ivy Tech, Matthew Nicholson was elected to his first term as mayor. He carried the election with 1,963 (59.3%) votes versus challenger Rexanne Ude who received 1,350 (40%) votes. Since his election, in addition to his official duties, Nicholson has joined the board of directors for Main Street Seymour, Indiana and regularly contributes to the local newspaper.

Education
 Seymour Community Schools operates Seymour High School.
 Trinity Lutheran High School, a private educational institution for grades 9–12.
 Seymour Public library, a branch of the Jackson County Public Library.

Culture 

The Actors Community Theatre of Seymour (ACTS) is a non-profit organization founded in 2013. ACTS is dedicated to the propagation and preservation of the theatrical arts in the area and has an ongoing schedule of theatrical performances.

The Southern Indiana Center for the Arts (SICA) is a not-for-profit organization operated by a volunteer board of directors and an executive director owned by the Mellencamp family since 1991 that provides art education and helps draw attention to the area of Jackson County as an art conscious region.

The yearly Oktoberfest celebrates the city's German heritage and has been held since 1973.

Scoop the Loop is a local weekend car show that started in 2011 but can trace its origins back to the years following WWII.

The H. Vance Swope Memorial Art Gallery was created at the bequest of the artist and relative of then-mayor Allen Swope and contains works by regional artists.

Until 2019, Seymour was the last town in the United States to celebrate Victory over Japan Day with a local parade. Beginning in 1946, the parade was held annually for 73 years until the local VFW voted to discontinue the tradition.

National Register of Historic Places

Transportation

Railroads 

The Pennsylvania Railroad succeeded the Jeffersonville Railroad (built northward). A Chessie System caboose is placed in front of the Blish Mill grain tower.

The Ohio and Mississippi Railway, built westward, was acquired by the Baltimore & Ohio in 1893. It has been operated by CSX since 1986.

The Evansville & Richmond Railroad (after 1910 the Chicago, Terre Haute & Southeastern Railroad (CTH&SE), or "the Milwaukee") was built eastward toward Richmond, reached Seymour in 1890, and connected with New York Central in Westport. Trackage east of Seymour was "cut off" in 1961, and operations to Bedford closing in 1978.

The Interstate Public Service interurban lines reached Seymour from Columbus in October 1907. Interstate merged into Midland United Company, leased to Indiana Railway, and all trains south of Seymour stopped running to Louisville in September 1939. Operations continued north of Seymour to Indianapolis until a collision on September 8, 1941, that wrecked "the majority of the line's rolling stock."

Interstates
  Interstate 65

US Highways

Indiana State Roads

Annual events
 Oktoberfest celebrates German heritage in Seymour. The festival is held the first weekend of October annually.
 Pepsi Plunge is annual age group swim meet that typically takes place in July of each year at the city pool in Shield's Park. This competitive event typically gathers near 1,000 competitive swimmers. The home-club for this swim meet is Seymour Swimming, coached by Dave Boggs. This swim meet is USA Swimming sanctioned.
 Scoop the Loop occurs the fourth weekend of every August. A car show and downtown parade are held on Friday and Saturday, respectively.
 Fear Fair Haunted House is open during weekends through the Fall every year, including Special events during Christmas & Valentine's Day.

Notable people

Notable groups and organizations
 The Elms, Rock and Roll band active between 2000 and 2010
 Reno Gang, committed first peacetime train robbery in the United States in Seymour in 1866

References in media

Movies

 Falling from Grace, 1991 movie set in Seymour
 The Legend of Jack and Diane, 2022 movie set in Seymour
 The Legend of the Reno Brothers, 2013 documentary about the Reno Gang
 Love Me Tender, 1956 western starting Elvis Presley
 Rage at Dawn, 1956 movie set in Seymour and nearby North Vernon, Indiana

Books
 The Air Force Integrates: 1945–1964 – World War II, Freeman Field Mutiny, MacDill Riot, Unbunching, Eisenhower, Little Rock, Kennedy Era and the Civil Rights Act, Travis Riot, Blacks in USAF, Progressive Management, 2015, Smashwords
 Anarchy in the Heartland: The Reno Gang Saga, A.D. Distler, 2012, Creatspace/Amazon
 Born in a Small Town: John Mellencamp, Heather Johnson, 2007, Omnibus Press
 The First Documented History of Jackson County, Indiana, 1816–1976; Vol. 01, Edwin J Boley, 1980, unknown publisher
 The Freeman Field Mutiny, James C Warren, 1995, Conyers Publishing Company
 The Freeman Field Mutiny, a Study in Leadership, John D Murphy, 2012, Biblioscholar
 Freeman Field The Rest of the Story (Illustrated Black Aviation Book 3), Guy Franklin, Chris Hopkins (Illustrator), 2016, Guy E. Franklin
 Great-Grandma's Outlaw Cousins: The Notorious Reno Brothers, Leslie Anne Perry, 2015, CreateSpace Independent Publishing Platform
 Highway 50: Ain't that America, Jim Lilliefors, 1993, Fulcrum Publishing
 The Masked Halters, Edwin J Boley, 1977, Graessle-Mercer Co.
 Mellencamp, Paul Rees, 2021, Atria Books
 Mellencamp: American Troubadour, David Masciotra, 2015, University of Kentucky Press
 Penal Ordinances City of Seymour, Indiana, George Grassle, Fred Evert, 1906, The Making of Modern Law: Primary Sources, Published in Pamphlet form According to Law
 The Reno Brothers, Jesse Lee Vint, 2013, Createspace Independent Publishing Platform
 Railroad Depots of Southern Indiana , David E Longest, 2005, Arcadia Publishing
 The Tuskegee Airmen: Mutiny at Freeman Field, James C. Warren, 2001, Conyers Publishing Company
 Indiana Folklore: A Reader, 1980, Indiana University Press.

Songs
 Mellencamp, John. "Small Town", Scarecrow, Riva, 1985.
 Mellencamp, John. "Rain on the Scarecrow", Scarecrow, Riva, 1985.

Television
 John Cougar Mellencamp: Jack and Diane, Music Video, 1982, 4m:18s, filmed in around the Seymour, Indiana area
 John Cougar Mellencamp: Hurts So Good, Music Video, 1982, 3m:27s, filmed in around the Seymour, Indiana area
 John Cougar Mellencamp: Human Wheels, Music Video, 1993, 5m:33s, filmed in around the Seymour, Indiana area
 John Cougar Mellencamp: Pink Houses, Music Video, 1983, 4m:48s, filmed in around the Seymour, Indiana area
 John Cougar Mellencamp: Small Town, Music Video, 1985, 5m:00s, filmed in around the Seymour, Indiana area
 John Cougar Mellencamp: Rain on the Scarecrow, Music Video, 1985, 4m:32s, filmed in around the Seymour, Indiana area and includes local residents.
 John Cougar Mellencamp: Wild Nights, Music Video, 1994, 3m:31s, filmed in around the Seymour, Indiana area

Nearby points of interest
 Bell Ford Bridge – A dilapidated covered bridge originally passed over the East Fork of the White River on a former alignment of State Road 258, and was placed on the National Register of Historic Places on March 25, 2005.
 Freeman Municipal Airport – A public use airport, and it is located at 2.6 miles (4.2 km) south-southwest of the downtown. During the World War II, it was the Freeman Army Airfield.
 Hoosier National Forest 202,814 acres managed by the United States Forest Service
 Jackson–Washington State Forest  An 18,000 acres state forest offering camping, fishing, hunting, archery, and trails for hiking, horseback riding, and cycling
 Muscatatuck National Wildlife Refuge – located at 3 miles (5 km) east of the downtown.
 Southern Indiana Center for the Arts (including gallery of John Mellencamp oil paintings)
 Starve Hollow State Recreation Area – A 280-acre state recreation area located near Vallonia, Indiana

Local media

Radio

Print
 The Seymour Tribune is a newspaper published Mondays through Saturdays
 Jackson County Banner is a semi-weekly publication from nearby Brownstown, Indiana

See also

References

External links
 City of Seymour, Indiana website
 History of the O&M Shops, Seymour, Indiana
 Jackson County, Indiana Chamber of Commerce
 WTUI Documentary
 1952 Centennial Celebration
 James Shields Memorial Gym

Cities in Indiana
Cities in Jackson County, Indiana
Micropolitan areas of Indiana